Mount Othrys ( – oros Othrys, also Όθρη – Othri) is a mountain range of central Greece, in the northeastern part of Phthiotis and southern part of Magnesia. The population density in the mountains is low: there are a few small villages, including Anavra in the northwest, Kokkotoi in the northeast, Palaiokerasia in the south and Neraida in the southwest. The Pagasetic Gulf lies to the northeast, and the Malian Gulf lies to the south. The peaks of the range are above the tree line. The main mineral constituent of the rock is ophiolite.

A Natura 2000 protected area has been has been defined over much, but not all, of the range according to the Birds Directive. Of interest to the government is the protection of the raptors and the prevention of clear-cutting and other settlement measures that would destroy their traditional habitat. The area, named Oros Othrys, Vouna Gkouras kai Farangi Palaiokerasias, ID GR1430006, includes the eastern range, a spur to the south to cover Palaiokerasia Gorge, and a spur to the north to cover Gkouras Hill.

History
On February 5, 1991, a Lockheed  C-130H Hercules 748 crashed into the mountain, killing 63 people.

Mythology
In Greek mythology, Mount Othrys was the base of Cronus and the other Titans during the ten-year war with the Olympian gods known as the Titanomachy. It was also the birthplace of the elder gods, Hestia, Demeter, Hera, Hades and Poseidon. It was assaulted by the Olympians, led by Cronus's son Zeus. Zeus later overthrew his father and gained dominion in all of the heavens and the earth.

Tunnel 
It passes underneath Othrys mountain. Work began in 2008, along with the rest of the motorway, but stopped in 2011 because of the Greek government-debt crisis. Construction resumed in 2019, along with the rest of the southern section. Its construction has faced challenges. It is the longest road tunnel of the whole motorway and it will be one of the longest in Greece. The tunnel has already been excavated on both sides, as of October 2021.

References

External links

 Minerals database
 Structural Pertology of Plagioclase Peridotites in the West Othris Mountains
 ΟΘΡΥΣ 

Locations in Greek mythology
Landforms of Phthiotis
Othrys
Landforms of Magnesia (regional unit)
Othrys
Natura 2000 in Greece